The , officially nicknamed the , is a commuter rail line and service in the Osaka-Kobe-Kyoto Metropolitan Area of Japan, owned and operated by West Japan Railway Company (JR West). The line connects Kizu Station in Kyoto Prefecture and Kyōbashi Station in Osaka.

The common name "Gakkentoshi Line", literally "Research City Line", comes from the Kansai Science City, which is located along the line around the border of Osaka and Nara prefectures.

Basic data

Operators, distances: 
West Japan Railway Company (Category-1, Services and tracks)
Japan Freight Railway Company (Category-2, Services)
Track:
Double-track line:
From Matsuiyamate to Kyōbashi
Single-track line:
From Kizu to Matsuiyamate
Railway signalling:
From JR Miyamaki to Kyōbashi: Automatic
From Kizu to JR Miyamaki: Special Automatic (Track Circuit Detection)
CTC centers:Ōsaka Operation Control Center
CTC system:JR Takarazuka JR Tozai Gakkentoshisen traffic control system

History
Two years later, the Kansai Railway bought the line in order to have its own trunk line to Osaka from Nagoya, combined with constructing the section between Shijōnawate and Kizu. Katamachi Station was unable to be expanded, thus Amijima terminus was constructed. However Kansai Railway bought the  line from Nara via Ōji to Minatomachi (present ) in downtown Osaka, and shifted its main line to the ex-Naniwa Railway line. Thereafter, the Katamachi Line became a branch of the railway network of Osaka.

The Shigino to Hanaten section was duplicated in 1927, with the Katamachi to Shigino section double-tracked in 1955, the Hanaten to Shijonawate section in 1969, extended to Nagao in 1979, to Matsuiyamate in 1989, and the balance of the section to Kyobashi double-tracked between 2007 and 2009.

The section between Katamachi and Shijōnawate became the first Japan Governmental Railways electrified line in Osaka-Kobe-Kyoto area in 1932, with electrification extended to Nagao in 1950. After privatization of the then Japanese National Railways (JNR), the line became part of the West Japan Railway Company (JR West) system, and the Kizu to Nagao section was electrified in 1989.

In 1997, the JR Tōzai Line was opened and connected to Katamachi Line at Kyōbashi, and Katamachi Station was closed (with Ōsakajō-kitazume Station becoming the replacement station). Most trains began operating through to the Fukuchiyama Line (JR Takarazuka Line).

Converted from a freight branch to a passenger route, the Osaka Higashi Line began service in 2008. Trains from Nara via Kansai Main (Yamatoji) Line began operation to Amagasaki Station. However, these through trains to Amagasaki have now ceased operation since March 2019, with the Osaka Higashi Line extension.

Station numbering was introduced to the line in March 2018 with stops being assigned station numbers between JR-H18 and JR-H41.

Military use

Route and operation
This link enables trains operated from Nara to the west, as Kobe, Himeji, and Sanda.

Rapid services of several types of stops, with no surcharge, are also provided. Abbreviations are tentative for this article.

Some trains terminate at Matsuiyamate due to the single track to Kizu.

Operated all day, most trains between Matsuiyamate and Nishi-Akashi on Sanyō Main (JR Kobe) Line. Some in busy hours to Fukuchiyama Line (JR Takarazuka Line), some terminate at Kyōbashi.

Operated in early morning, late night, and busy hours only. Some from/to Nara, most from/to Dōshishamae or Kyōtanabe. Through to Nishiakashi or Shin-Sanda.

Mostly through to Shin-Sanda or Sasayamaguchi on Fukuchiyama (JR Takarazuka) Line. One per 15 minutes per direction.

Past services

Through trains from Osaka Higashi Line, operated only between Hanaten and Kyōbashi in this line. Four trains to Amagasaki from Nara in the morning, 4 vice versa in the evening. This service has ceased operation on the Katamachi Line starting from 16 March 2019, with the opening of the Shin-Osaka Extension of the Osaka Higashi Line.

Stations

Rolling stock
 207 series (from 1991)
 321 series (from 2005)

All trains are based at Aboshi Depot.

Former
 40 series
 51 series
 72 series
 101 series
 103 series
 223-6000 series (until March 2011)
 KiHa 10 series
 KiHa 20 series
 KiHa 35 series
 KiHa 40 series
 KiHa 45 series
 KiHa 58 series
 KiHa 41000

References 

Lines of West Japan Railway Company

Railway lines opened in 1895
1067 mm gauge railways in Japan